Arthur Raymond Tonkin (21 January 1930 – 5 May 2022) was an Australian politician who was a Labor Party member of the Legislative Assembly of Western Australia from 1971 to 1987. He was a minister in the government of Brian Burke.

Biography
Arthur Tonkin was born in Perth to Florence May (née Cole) and Norman Sedrick Tonkin. He studied at the University of Western Australia and Claremont Teachers College, and subsequently worked as a teacher (both in the metropolitan area and in the country). A member of the State School Teachers Union, Tonkin was elected to parliament at the 1971 state election, winning the seat of Mirrabooka from the Liberal Party's Doug Cash. His seat was abolished at the 1974 election, and he successfully transferred to the new seat of Morley. Tonkin was elevated to shadow cabinet after the 1977 election, and would serve under three leaders of the opposition (Colin Jamieson, Ron Davies, and Brian Burke).

At a redistribution prior to the 1983 state election, Tonkin's seat was abolished and replaced with the new seat of Morley-Swan. After the election, which Labor won, he was made Minister for Water Resources, Minister for Consumer Affairs, and Minister for Parliamentary and Electoral Reform, as well as Leader of the House. He lost the consumer affairs portfolio to Peter Dowding in December 1983, having presented "too hardline an image" in his dealings with business. In a reshuffle after the 1986 election, Tonkin lost the electoral reform portfolio to Mal Bryce, but replaced Jeff Carr as Minister for Police and Emergency Services. However, he resigned from the ministry less than three months later, and resigned from parliament altogether in March 1987.

References

|-

1930 births
2022 deaths
Australian schoolteachers
Australian Labor Party members of the Parliament of Western Australia
Members of the Western Australian Legislative Assembly
Politicians from Perth, Western Australia
University of Western Australia alumni